The Independent Spirit Award for Best Film (or Best Feature) is one of the annual Independent Spirit Awards, presented to recognize the best in independent filmmaking, it was first awarded in 1985 with Martin Scorsese's film After Hours being the first recipient of the award.

Criteria
In order to be considered as an independent film and therefore being eligible to this category, nomination committees base their decision on four criteria, "uniqueness of vision, original, provocative subject matter, percentage of financing from independent sources and economy of means"; the latter refers to a budget ceiling of $22.5 million.

In the following lists, the first titles listed are winners. These are also in bold and in blue background; those not in bold are nominees.

Winners and nominees

Notes
≠ indicates the winning film is also an Academy Award for Best Picture winner
° indicates the winning film is also an Academy Award for Best Picture nominee

1980s

1990s

2000s

2010s

2020s

Distributors with most wins and nominations (3 or more)
Netflix - 3 (one win)
A24 - 12 (three wins)
Island Pictures - 3 (one win)
Fox Searchlight/Searchlight Pictures - 17 (eight wins)
Orion Pictures - 4 (one win)
Columbia/Sony Pictures Classics - 20 (one win)
The Weinstein Company - 4 (two wins)
Miramax - 9 (three wins)
Universal/Focus Features - 13 (four wins)
Fine Line Features - 7 (two wins)
IFC Films - 5 (no wins)
Samuel Goldwyn - 8 (no wins)
MGM/United Artists - 4 (1 win)
Artisan Entertainment - 3 (no wins)
New Line Cinema - 6 (one win)
October Films - 7 (one win)
Lionsgate - 7 (two wins)
New Yorker Films - 3 (no wins)
Warner Bros/Warner Independent Films - 3 (two wins)
Paramount/Paramount Vantage - 5 (one win)

References

External links
Every BEST FEATURE winner on the official Film Independent YouTube channel

F
Awards for best film